The Liuyang River , also known as Liu River or Liuwei River, is a right-bank tributary of Xiang River, the largest tributary of Xiang River in Changsha, Hunan Province, China. It flows through Liuyang City, Changsha County, Yuhua, Furong and Kaifu Districts, and merges into Xiang River at Xinhe Delta Mouth of Kaifu District.

The Liuyang River flows generally east to west. The Liuyang River has two source flows which are Daxi River and Xiaoxi River, of which Daxi River is the main stream and its upper course.

Course
The river flows from the headwaters through Daweishan, Dahu, Guandu, Yanxi, Yonghe, Gugang and Gaoping 7 towns of Liuyang City to its confluence with the Xiaoxi River at Shuangjiang Village of Gaoping Town. The river rises in the south of Dawei Mountains and runs through Zhangfang, Xiaohe and Gaoping. 

Middle Liuyang River: The river is formally called the Liuyang River from the Daxi River's confluence with the Xiaoxi River at Shuangjiang of Gaoping.  The middle section flows through Guankou, Hehua, Huaichuan, Jili, Chengchong, Puji and Zhentou.

Lower Liuyang River: The river is called the Lower Liuyang River from its confluence with the Jianjiang River in the northeast of seat of Zhentou Town to its mouth at Xinhe Delta of Kaifu District. From the estuary of Jianjiang River in Zhentou Town, the Liuyang River flows through Baijia of Liuyang City, Huangxing, Jiangbei Towns and Langli Subdistrict of Changsha County, Tiaoma Town, Dongshan and Lituo Subdistricts of Yuhua District, Mapoling, Huoxing, Donghu, Dong'an, Xianghu and Mawangdui Subdistricts of Furong District, Hongshan, Yuehu, Sifangping, Dongfenglu, Furongbeilu, Xinhe Subdistricts of Kaifu District.

Culture

A Chinese modern folk song, Liuyang River, was sung by Li Guyi.

References

External links

Rivers of Changsha
Tributaries of the Xiang River